Outcast is an American horror drama television series based on the comics of the same name by Robert Kirkman and Paul Azaceta. A ten-episode first season debuted on Cinemax on June 3, 2016. It is a supernatural horror story that features people involved in demonic possession, and revolves around the life of Kyle Barnes, who is rejected by the people of Rome, West Virginia, for allegedly hurting his wife and daughter.

On March 14, 2016, ahead of its premiere, Outcast was renewed for a second season. The second season premiered on Fox in the UK on April 3, 2017, and concluded on June 5, 2017. It began airing in the United States on July 20, 2018, and concluded on September 28, 2018. On October 2, 2018, it was announced that Cinemax had officially cancelled the series.

Cast and characters

Main cast
 Patrick Fugit as Kyle Barnes, a young man struggling with the effects of demonic possession 
 Philip Glenister as John Anderson, the local Reverend and a close associate of Kyle
 Wrenn Schmidt as Megan Holter, Kyle's sister and wife of Mark
 Kate Lyn Sheil as Allison Barnes, Kyle's ex-wife and the mother of his daughter, Amber
 David Denman as Mark Holter, a local police officer and husband of Megan (season 1; guest season 2)
 Julia Crockett as Sarah Barnes, Kyle's estranged mother who also suffered from possession
 Brent Spiner as Sidney, a mysterious preacher
 Reg E. Cathey as Byron Giles, Rome's Chief of Police
 Madeleine McGraw as Amber Barnes, Kyle and Allison's daughter (recurring season 1; main season 2)

Supporting cast
 Gabriel Bateman as Joshua Austin, a young boy who is also suffering from possession (guest season 1; recurring season 2)
 C. J. Hoff as Aaron MacCready
 Melinda McGraw as Patricia MacCready
 Pete Burris as Officer Lenny Ogden (season 1; guest season 2)
 Debra Christofferson as Kat Ogden (season 1; guest season 2)
 Willie C. Carpenter as Norville Grant (season 1)
 Scott Porter as Donnie Hamel (season 1)
 Callie McClincy as Holly Holter, Megan and Mark's daughter
 Charmin Lee as Rose Giles
 Briana Venskus as Officer Nuñez (season 2)
 Chris Greene as Oscar (season 2)
 C. Thomas Howell as Simon Barnes; Kyle's estranged father (season 2)
 Hoon Lee as Dr. Kenneth Park (season 2)
 M. C. Gainey as Bob Caldwell; local junkyard owner (season 2)
 Madelyn Deutch as Dakota (season 2)

Production
Fox International Studios and Robert Kirkman developed the television series before the comic book was published. Cinemax picked up the United States rights for the project after the script was done. The series is produced by Fox International Studios for Cinemax in the United States and Fox international channels outside of the country. Robert Kirkman's Skybound Entertainment is also a producer on the series.

A 10-episode initial order was announced with lead cast Patrick Fugit as Kyle Barnes and Philip Glenister as Reverend Anderson, along with Gabriel Bateman, while Adam Wingard was hired to direct the pilot produced by Fox International Channels. More cast was announced including David Denman as Mark Holter, Melinda McGraw as Patricia MacCready, Grace Zabriskie as Mildred, Catherine Dent as Janet Anderson, Lee Tergesen as Blake Morrow, and Brent Spiner.

On August 10, 2015, production began on the first season in South Carolina. The cities of Chester and York, South Carolina were transformed into the series' fictitious town of Rome, West Virginia.

Episodes

Season 1 (2016)

Season 2 (2017)

Broadcast
Internationally, the series is broadcast by Fox International Channels starting in June 2016. On May 20, 2016, in Europe, Fox Networks Group streamed the first episode over Facebook Live. TV5 air the episodes on Philippine free-to-air television within 24 hours of their American premiere starting June 4, 2016.

Reception

Critical response
The first season received mostly positive reviews from critics. The review aggregator website Rotten Tomatoes gave the series an approval rating of 79%, based on 38 reviews, with an average rating of 8.1/10. The site's critical consensus reads, "A cut above average summer fare, Outcast provides the genuine chills one should – but often can't – expect from television horror." Metacritic, which uses a weighted average, assigned the series a score of 70 out of 100, based on 28 critics, indicating "generally favorable reviews".

Jasef Wisener of TVOvermind, gave the pilot episode a 4.8/5, praising the premiere for not "hold[ing] back with the action or the frights," calling it "fun as hell" and a "series for anyone that likes horror." James Charisma of Playboy noted that unlike the horror in series creator Robert Kirkman's other series, The Walking Dead, in Outcast, "the threat is unseen, lurking under the surface ... characters exist in the present but live in the past, haunted by terrors and ordeals from days gone by."

Awards and nominations

References

External links 
 
 

2010s American drama television series
2010s American horror television series
2016 American television series debuts
2018 American television series endings
Cinemax original programming
English-language television shows
Television shows based on comics
Television series based on Image Comics
Television shows set in West Virginia